Krung Diew Kor Kern Por is a 1988 Thai romantic-drama film directed by Manop Udomdej. The film portrays an unhappy love affair and is an attempt to draw the attention of the people to the women's position in Thailand, especially their difficulties of proving a rape and aborting. The movie received four gold statuette awards (รางวัลตุ๊กตาทอง) in 1987.

References

External links
 

1988 films
Thai romantic drama films
Thai-language films